Slovenia participated in the Eurovision Song Contest 2018 with the song "Hvala, ne!" written by Lea Sirk and Tomy DeClerque. The song was performed by Lea Sirk. Slovenian broadcaster Radiotelevizija Slovenija (RTV Slovenija) organised the national selection EMA 2017 in order to select the Slovenian entry for the 2018 contest in Lisbon, Portugal. After a one-week-long competition consisting of a semi-final and a final, "Hvala, ne!" performed by Lea Sirk emerged as the winner after achieving the highest score following the combination of votes from six thematical juries and a public vote.

Slovenia was drawn to compete in the second semi-final of the Eurovision Song Contest which took place on 10 May 2018. Performing during the show in position 17, "Hvala, ne!" was announced among the top 10 entries of the second semi-final and therefore qualified to compete in the final on 12 May. It was later revealed that Slovenia placed eighth out of the 18 participating countries in the semi-final with 132 points. In the final, Slovenia performed in position 3 and placed twenty-second out of the 26 participating countries with 64 points.

Background 

Slovenia's highest placing in the contest, to this point, has been seventh place, which the nation achieved on two occasions: in 1995 with the song "Prisluhni mi" performed by Darja Švajger and in 2001 with the song "Energy" performed by Nuša Derenda. The country's only other top ten result was achieved in 1997 when Tanja Ribič performing "Zbudi se" placed tenth. Since the introduction of semi-finals to the format of the contest in 2004, Slovenia had thus far only managed to qualify to the final on four occasions. In 2017, "On My Way" performed by Omar Naber failed to qualify to the final.

The Slovenian national broadcaster, Radiotelevizija Slovenija (RTV Slovenija), broadcasts the event within Slovenia and organises the selection process for the nation's entry. RTV Slovenija confirmed Slovenia's participation in the 2018 Eurovision Song Contest on 15 September 2017. The Slovenian entry for the Eurovision Song Contest has traditionally been selected through a national final entitled Evrovizijska Melodija (EMA), which has been produced with variable formats. To this point, the broadcaster has only foregone the use of this national final in 2013 when the Slovenian entry was internally selected. For 2018, the broadcaster opted to organise EMA 2018 to select the Slovenian entry.

Before Eurovision

EMA 2018 
EMA 2018 was the 22nd edition of the Slovenian national final format Evrovizijska Melodija (EMA). The competition was used by RTV Slovenija to select Slovenia's entry for the Eurovision Song Contest 2018. The 2018 edition of EMA took place at the RTV Slovenija Studio 1 in Ljubljana and consisted of two shows: a semi-final and a final. The competition was broadcast on TV SLO1, Radio Val 202, Radio Koper, Radio Maribor and online via the broadcaster's RTV 4D platform.

Format 
Sixteen songs competed in two televised shows consisting of a semi-final on 17 February 2018 and a final on 24 February 2018. Sixteen songs competed in the semi-final with a seven-member expert jury and public televoting selecting eight finalists out of the sixteen songs to proceed to the final. The televote selected the first four finalists and the jury selected the other four finalists. In the final, the winner was selected by the 50/50 combination of points from six thematical juries and public televoting.

Competing entries
Artists and composers were able to submit their entries to the broadcaster between 15 September 2017 and 15 November 2017. 108 entries were received by the broadcaster during the submission period. An expert committee consisting of Maja Keuc, Eva Hren (musician and guitar teacher), Jernej Vene (music editor for Radio Val 202) and Tadej Košir (musician, guitarist and songwriter) selected sixteen artists and songs for the competition from the received submissions. The competing artists were announced on 8 December 2017. Among the competing artists were former Slovenian Eurovision contestants Tanja Ribič who represented Slovenia in 1997 and ManuElla who represented Slovenia in 2016.

Shows

Semi-final 
The semi-final of EMA 2018 took place on 17 February 2018, hosted by Vid Valič. Eight entries qualified to the final. The sixteen competing entries first faced a public vote where the top four proceeded. An additional four qualifiers were then selected out of the remaining twelve entries by a seven-member jury panel. The jury consisted of Maja Keuc (musician, singer and 2011 Slovenian Eurovision entrant), Hannah Mancini (singer-songwriter and 2013 Slovenian Eurovision entrant), Raiven (musician and singer), Robi Pikl (singer and guitarist), Žiga Klančar (music editor for Radio Val 202), Emi Den Baruca (video artist designer) and Mario Galunič (responsible editor of entertainment programmes at RTV Slovenija).

Final 
The final of EMA 2018 took place on 24 February 2018, hosted by Vid Valič and Raiven. All competing songs were required to be performed in Slovene during the semi-final of the competition, while in the final the song was required to be performed in the language that the artist intended to perform in at the Eurovision Song Contest. Two of the entries competed in English ("Promise" performed by BQL and "Glow" performed by Ina Shai), while the other six entries remained in Slovene. In addition to the performances of the competing entries, 2005 and 2017 Slovenian Eurovision entrant Omar Naber, 2011 Slovenian Eurovision entrant Amaya and co-host Raiven performed as guests. The combination of points from six thematical juries and a public vote selected "Hvala, ne!" performed by Lea Sirk as the winner. Each jury group distributed their points as follows: 2, 4, 6, 8, 10 and 12 points, while the viewers distributed their points as follows: 12, 24, 36, 48, 60 and 72 points. The juries consisted of members from OGAE Slovenia, songwriters, radio personalities, television personalities, music performers and international artists.

Promotion 
Lea Sirk made several appearances across Europe to specifically promote "Hvala, ne!" as the Slovenian Eurovision entry. Between 8 and 11 April, Sirk took part in promotional activities in Tel Aviv, Israel and performed during the Israel Calling event held at the Rabin Square. On 14 April, Sirk performed during the Eurovision in Concert event which was held at the AFAS Live venue in Amsterdam, Netherlands and hosted by Edsilia Rombley and Cornald Maas. On 21 April, Lea Sirk performed during the ESPreParty event which was held at the Sala La Riviera venue in Madrid, Spain and hosted by Soraya Arnelas.

At Eurovision 
According to Eurovision rules, all nations with the exceptions of the host country and the "Big Five" (France, Germany, Italy, Spain and the United Kingdom) are required to qualify from one of two semi-finals in order to compete for the final; the top ten countries from each semi-final progress to the final. The European Broadcasting Union (EBU) split up the competing countries into six different pots based on voting patterns from previous contests, with countries with favourable voting histories put into the same pot. On 29 January 2018, a special allocation draw was held which placed each country into one of the two semi-finals, as well as which half of the show they would perform in. Slovenia was placed into the second semi-final, to be held on 10 May 2018, and was scheduled to perform in the second half of the show.

Once all the competing songs for the 2018 contest had been released, the running order for the semi-finals was decided by the shows' producers rather than through another draw, so that similar songs were not placed next to each other. Slovenia was set to perform in position 17, following the entry from Montenegro and before the entry from Ukraine.

In Slovenia, the semi-finals were televised on RTV SLO2 and the final was televised on RTV SLO1 with commentary by Andrej Hofer. The Slovenian spokesperson, who announced the top 12-point score awarded by the Slovenian jury during the final, was Maja Keuc who represented Slovenia in the Eurovision Song Contest 2011.

Semi-final

Lea Sirk took part in technical rehearsals on 2 and 5 May, followed by dress rehearsals on 9 and 10 May. This included the jury show on 9 May where the professional juries of each country watched and voted on the competing entries.

The Slovenian performance featured Lea Sirk performing in a black body suit, joined by four dancers on stage where they performed a synchronised choreographed routine. The performers made use of the outer circle of the stage during the second chorus of the song, during which Sirk stopped the music for a temporary break to interact with the audience. Sirk sang the last chorus of "Hvala, ne!" in Portuguese. The Slovenian performance was choreographed by Erik Bukovnik. The dancers featured during the performance were Karin Putrih, Tajda Kozamelj, Veronika Škrlj and Anja Möderndorfer. Lea Sirk was also joined by an off-stage backing vocalist: Karin Zemljič.

At the end of the show, Slovenia was announced as having finished in the top 10 and subsequently qualifying for the grand final. It was later revealed that Slovenia placed eighth in the semi-final, receiving a total of 132 points: 65 points from the televoting and 67 points from the juries.

Final
Shortly after the second semi-final, a winners' press conference was held for the ten qualifying countries. As part of this press conference, the qualifying artists took part in a draw to determine which half of the grand final they would subsequently participate in. This draw was done in the order the countries were announced during the semi-final. Slovenia was drawn to compete in the first half. Following this draw, the shows' producers decided upon the running order of the final, as they had done for the semi-finals. Slovenia was subsequently placed to perform in position 3, following the entry from Spain and before the entry from Lithuania.

Lea Sirk once again took part in dress rehearsals on 11 and 12 May before the final, including the jury final where the professional juries cast their final votes before the live show. Lea Sirk performed a repeat of her semi-final performance during the final on 12 May. Slovenia placed twenty-second in the final, scoring 64 points: 23 points from the televoting and 41 points from the juries.

Voting
Voting during the three shows involved each country awarding two sets of points from 1–8, 10 and 12: one from their professional jury and the other from televoting. Each nation's jury consisted of five music industry professionals who are citizens of the country they represent, with their names published before the contest to ensure transparency. This jury judged each entry based on: vocal capacity; the stage performance; the song's composition and originality; and the overall impression by the act. In addition, no member of a national jury was permitted to be related in any way to any of the competing acts in such a way that they cannot vote impartially and independently. The individual rankings of each jury member as well as the nation's televoting results were released shortly after the grand final.

Below is a breakdown of points awarded to Slovenia and awarded by Slovenia in the second semi-final and grand final of the contest, and the breakdown of the jury voting and televoting conducted during the two shows:

Points awarded to Slovenia

Points awarded by Slovenia

Detailed voting results
The following members comprised the Slovene jury:
 Sara Briški Cirman (Raiven; jury chairperson)singer, musician, harpist
 Martin Štibernik (Mistermarsh)composer, singer, producer
 Nikola Sekulovičmusician
 Mitja Bobičmusician, singer, producer
 Alenka Godecsinger

References

External links

  

2018
Countries in the Eurovision Song Contest 2018
Eurovision